Massimo Scali (born 11 December 1979) is an Italian former competitive ice dancer. With partner Federica Faiella, he is the 2010 World bronze medalist, a two-time (2009–2010) European silver medalist, and a six-time (2003–2005, 2007–2009) Italian national champion. They also won eleven Grand Prix medals.

Career

Early years 
Massimo Scali began skating at the age of ten. His early ice dance career was with Flavia Ottaviani, with whom he won six medals on the Junior Grand Prix. They were the 1997/1998 Junior Grand Prix Final bronze medalists. He and Faiella trained at the same rink under the same coach. After his partner quit skating, he briefly partnered with Jennifer Wester.

Partnership with Faiella 
Scali teamed up with Federica Faiella in 2001. Despite skating together for only a brief period of time, they were able to qualify for the 2002 Winter Olympics, where they finished 18th.

In their second season of competition together, Faiella/Scali won Italian nationals for the first time, and placed in the top ten at the European Championships. A year later, they moved into the top ten at Worlds. In the years leading up to the 2006 Winter Olympics, they continued to make steady progress up the ranks. Prior to the 2005-06 Olympic season, Barbara Fusar-Poli / Maurizio Margaglio, who won bronze for Italy at the 2002 Games, returned to the eligible ranks. Faiella/Scali became the second Italian team, and finished outside the top ten at the Olympics after a fall in the original dance.

Following the season, they made a coaching change and relocated to the United States to work with Pasquale Camerlengo and Anjelika Krylova at the Detroit Skating Club in Bloomfield Hills, Michigan. They had an up and down season in 2006-07 but enjoyed good results in 2007-08, including a fourth place at the Europeans and a fifth-place finish at Worlds.

In the 2008-09 season, Faiella/Scali finished second at the Trophee Eric Bompard and won their first Grand Prix event, the 2008 NHK Trophy. This qualified them for their first Grand Prix final, where they finished fourth. They won their first European medal, a silver, behind Russians Jana Khokhlova / Sergei Novitski. At the 2009 World Championships, a fall in the original dance ended their hopes of medal contention, and they finished eighth.

In the 2009–10 Olympic season, Faiella/Scali began their season with a bronze medal at the 2009 Cup of China. They withdrew from their next Grand Prix event due to Faiella's illness. At the 2010 Europeans, they won both the original dance and the free dance on their way to their second European silver medal. They finished fifth at the Olympics. Faiella fell ill after the Olympics and returned to the ice only four days before the World Championships. The duo won their first world medal, a bronze, in Turin.

At the 2010 World Championships, Faiella/Scali announced that they would return for another season. Their assigned Grand Prix events in 2010-11 were the Cup of China and the Cup of Russia. Visa problems delayed their training in the U.S. and Faiella had recurring back problems. They again finished third at the 2010 Cup of China after Scali tripped on Faiella's skirts in both programs. They withdrew from the 2010 Cup of Russia prior to the free dance due to Scali's back injury. At the 2011 European Championships, they placed ninth in the short dance but moved up to fifth after the free dance.

On 15 March 2011, Scali announced on the team's website that they were retiring from competitive skating and that he would work with coach and choreographer Pasquale Camerlengo's team at the Detroit Skating Club. However, in May 2011, after Faiella's recovery progressed better than expected, they announced through their official website that they would in fact continue to skate competitively. An injury to Faiella ended this comeback attempt, and in 2012 Scali confirmed that they would not return to competitive skating.

Faiella/Scali often performed reverse lifts in competition, in which she lifted him.

Coaching career
In 2011, Scali began working as a coach and choreographer in Bloomfield Hills, Michigan at the Detroit Skating Club, alongside Camerlengo, Anjelika Krylova, Natalia Annenko-Deller, and Elizabeth Punsalan. He has worked with Madison Hubbell / Zachary Donohue, Danielle O'Brien / Gregory Merriman, and Alexandra Paul / Mitchell Islam. Scali was working as a coach and choreographer at the Arctic Edge in Canton, Michigan with Marina Zueva. He coached Maia Shibutani / Alex Shibutani until their retirement in 2018.

In addition to his coaching career he has also choreographed for several skaters. His clients include:

 Karen Chen
 Wakaba Higuchi 
 Alysa Liu
 Mai Mihara
 Kaori Sakamoto 
 Akiko Suzuki 
 Keiji Tanaka

Programs 

(with Faiella)

Competitive highlights

With Faiella

With Ottaviani

References

External links

 
 

1979 births
Living people
People from Monterotondo
Italian male ice dancers
Figure skaters at the 2002 Winter Olympics
Figure skaters at the 2006 Winter Olympics
Figure skaters at the 2010 Winter Olympics
Olympic figure skaters of Italy
World Figure Skating Championships medalists
European Figure Skating Championships medalists
Sportspeople from the Metropolitan City of Rome Capital
Figure skating choreographers